William Dills Smith (born March 28, 1995) is an American professional baseball catcher for the Los Angeles Dodgers of Major League Baseball (MLB). He played college baseball for the Louisville Cardinals. He was selected by the Dodgers in the first round of the 2016 Major League Baseball draft. He made his major league debut in 2019.

Amateur career
Smith attended Kentucky Country Day School in Louisville, Kentucky. In 2013, as a senior, he hit .528 with 11 home runs and 36 RBIs along with pitching to a 7–1 record 0.87 ERA. He went undrafted in the 2013 MLB draft and enrolled at the University of Louisville where he played college baseball. In 2015, he played collegiate summer baseball with the Brewster Whitecaps of the Cape Cod Baseball League. In 2016, his junior season, he slashed .382/.480/.567 with seven home runs and 43 RBIs in 55 games. After his junior year, he was selected by the Los Angeles Dodgers in the first round of the 2016 Major League Baseball draft. Smith signed on July 17, 2016, for a $1.775 million signing bonus.

Professional career

Minor leagues

Smith began his professional career with the Ogden Raptors of the Pioneer Baseball League and was then quickly promoted to the Class-A Great Lakes Loons of the Midwest League. He played in seven games for Ogden, 23 for Great Lakes and 25 for the Rancho Cucamonga Quakes of the California League, hitting a combined .246. He was named to the California League mid-season all-star team in 2017. He hit .232 in 72 games for the Quakes with 11 homers and 43 RBI. He was promoted to the Double-A Tulsa Drillers of the Texas League in July, but suffered a fractured hand after getting hit by a pitch in his debut with the Drillers and he spent the rest of the season on the disabled list. He split 2018 between Tulsa and the AAA Oklahoma City Dodgers of the Pacific Coast League, hitting .233 with 20 homers and 59 RBI.

Los Angeles Dodgers

2019 
Smith began 2019 with Oklahoma City but was promoted to the majors for the first time on May 27, 2019.  He made his major league debut the following day against the New York Mets and had two hits in four at-bats as the starting catcher. His first major league hit was a single off Steven Matz in the second inning. Smith's first MLB home run was a walk off against Héctor Neris of the Philadelphia Phillies on June 1, 2019. On June 23, 2019, Smith hit a walk-off three-run home run in the bottom of the ninth inning against the Colorado Rockies. It was the third straight game the Dodgers won on a walk-off home run by a rookie, an MLB record. He returned to the minors for a month and was selected to the Pacific Coast League team at the Triple-A All-Star Game.  In 62 total games for Oklahoma City in 2019 he hit .268 with 20 homers and 54 RBI. Smith was recalled to the majors again on July 26 to replace Austin Barnes as the Dodgers primary catcher and the following day hit a homer and two doubles against the Washington Nationals as well as driving in six runs, the most RBI by a Dodger rookie since James Loney in 2006. With 26 RBI and nine homers in his first 23 games, he passed Cody Bellinger for the most in franchise history through that many contests. He finished the 2019 campaign hitting .253/.337/.571 in 54 games with 15 homers and 42 RBIs. He had only one hit in 13 at-bats against the Nationals in the 2019 National League Division Series (NLDS).

2020 
In the pandemic-shortened 2020 season, Smith played in 37 games for the Dodgers and hit .289/.401/.579 with eight home runs and 25 RBIs. In the third game of the 2020 NLDS, Smith had five hits against the San Diego Padres, setting a new Dodgers franchise record for most hits in a post-season game. On October 16, during Game 5 of the National League Championship Series (NLCS) Smith became the first MLB player to face a pitcher of the same name in the postseason, Atlanta Braves pitcher Will Smith. The faceoff ended with Smith hitting a three-run home run. In the 2020 World Series against the Tampa Bay Rays, Smith had four hits in 24 at-bats, including a home run in Game 2. He also committed a fielding error that led to the Dodgers losing Game 4, however they won the series in six games.

2021 
In his first full season and third overall of his career, Smith played in 130 games for the Dodgers and hit .258/.365/.495 with new career highs of 25 home runs and 76 RBIs. Of his 130 games played, Smith played third base and first base for one game each as well as serving as a pinch runner or designated hitter for 16 games while playing catcher for the remaining 117 games. He also led the National League with 11 sacrifice flies. Smith started every game for the Dodgers at catcher in the postseason. He was hitless in three at-bats in the Wild Card Game, had six hits (including two home runs) in 18 at-bats in the 2021 NLDS and had four hits (one home run) in 23 at-bats in the 2021 NLCS.

2022
In 2022, Smith played in 137 games for the Dodgers, which included 109 at catcher and another 25 as the designated hitter. He had a .260 batting average, with 24 home runs and 87 RBIs.

2023
Smith signed a $5.25 million contract with the Dodgers in his first year of salary arbitration.

International career 
On August 29, 2022, Smith announced that he would represent the United States in the 2023 World Baseball Classic, joining fellow Dodgers Mookie Betts and Trea Turner.

Personal life
William Dills Smith was born on March 28, 1995, in Louisville, Kentucky. His parents are Mark and Julie Smith, and he has a younger sister, Sara. He grew up a Red Sox fan, and his favorite player was David Ortiz.

Smith married Cara Martinelli in December 2020 and their first child was born in October 2022.

References

External links

1995 births
Living people
Baseball players from Louisville, Kentucky
Kentucky Country Day School alumni
Major League Baseball catchers
Los Angeles Dodgers players
Louisville Cardinals baseball players
Brewster Whitecaps players
Ogden Raptors players
Great Lakes Loons players
Rancho Cucamonga Quakes players
Tulsa Drillers players
Glendale Desert Dogs players
Oklahoma City Dodgers players
2023 World Baseball Classic players